Kota Tulsipur is a village development committee in Kailali District in the Seti Zone of western Nepal. At the time of the 1991 Nepal census it had a population of 6210 living in 839 individual households.

References

External links
UN map of the municipalities of Kailali District

Populated places in Kailali District